The Cambridge Review of International Affairs is a quarterly peer-reviewed academic journal on international relations, particularly in the fields of international studies, international law, and international political economy. It is published by Routledge.

Background 
The journal was conceived in 1985 by graduate students in the Centre of International Studies (now part of the Department of Politics and International Studies) at the University of Cambridge. Its first issue was published in 1986. It is staffed by postgraduate students from the university and its current editorial team is headed by editors-in-chief Italo Brandimarte and Martin Kirsch.

Notable articles 
Most cited articles include Globalisation or 'glocalisation'? Networks, territories and rescaling by Erik Swyngedouw, Does capitalism need the state system? by Alex Callinicos and Europe's others and the return of geopolitics by Thomas Diez.

Abstracting and indexing 
The journal is abstracted and indexed in the Social Sciences Citation Index. According to the Journal Citation Reports, the journal has a 2019 impact factor of 1.366, ranking it 45th out of 95 journals in the category "International Relations", and 94th out of 181 in "Political Science".

References

External links 
 

International relations journals
Routledge academic journals
Quarterly journals
English-language journals
Publications established in 1986